Sousaki is a dormant volcano and modern solfatara field in northeastern Corinthia, Greece, at the northwest end of the South Aegean Volcanic Arc.

The volcano was active during the Pliocene and early Quaternary periods of the Earth's geological history. There is still significant solfataric activity at this location. The volcano erupted dacite lava. The geothermal system releases about 1 megagram per day of gases at 42 °C, 90% CO2 and < 1% each of CH4 and H2S. The earthquakes of 1997 of 3-4 R had as a result the uprising magma in higher areas of the earth crust. So future activities are possible. 

The last eruption of this volcano was a side eruption which created new land in the Gulf of Megara, where there are major port and refinery facilities.

References

 W. D'Alessandro et al., "Natural degassing activity of the geothermal system of Sousaki (Greece): Environmental impact and gas hazard issues", 8th International Conference on Gas Geochemistry, 2005. 
 W. D'Alessandro, "Gas hazard: an often neglected natural risk in volcanic areas"

External links

 Volcano Location

Volcanoes of Greece
Neogene volcanoes
Dormant volcanoes
Landforms of Corinthia
Landforms of Peloponnese (region)